Arcadia is a Census-designated place located in Spartanburg County in the U.S. State of South Carolina. According to the 2010 United States Census, the population was 2,634.

History
Arcadia was founded in 1902, and was so named for a fancied resemblance of its landscapes to the ancient region of Arcadia.

Geography
Arcadia is located at  (34.961075, -81.993118). These coordinates place the CDP to the west of the City of Spartanburg.

According to the United States Census Bureau, the CDP has a total land area of 1.960  square miles (5.087  km) and a total water area of 0.005  square mile (0.013  km).

Demographics

Education
It is in Spartanburg County School District 6.

References

Census-designated places in Spartanburg County, South Carolina
Census-designated places in South Carolina